Conashaugh Lakes is a census-designated place located in Dingman Township, Pike County in the state of Pennsylvania.  The community is located off Pennsylvania Route 739 to the south of Interstate 84.  As of the 2020 census the population was 1,425 residents.

Demographics

References

Census-designated places in Pike County, Pennsylvania
Census-designated places in Pennsylvania